Vilma Rudzenskaitė (born December 13, 1966) is a Lithuanian orienteering competitor. She received a bronze medal in relay at the 2002 European Orienteering Championships in Sümeg, together with Giedrė Voverienė and Ieva Sargautytė. The same Lithuanian team finished 4th at the 2003 World Orienteering Championships in Rapperswil-Jona.

References

External links
 
 Vilma Rudzenskaite at World of O Runners

1966 births
Living people
Lithuanian orienteers
Female orienteers
Foot orienteers
Competitors at the 2001 World Games
World Games silver medalists
World Games medalists in orienteering
Competitors at the 2005 World Games